The economy of Iraq is dominated by the oil sector, which has provided about 99.7% of foreign exchange earnings during its modern history. As of 2021, the oil sector provides about 92% of foreign exchange earnings. Iraq's hitherto agrarian economy underwent rapid development following the 14 July Revolution (1958) which overthrew the Hashemite Iraqi monarchy. It had become the third-largest economy in the Middle East by 1980. This occurred in part because of the Iraqi government's successful industrialization and infrastructure development initiatives in the 1970s, which included irrigation projects, railway and highway construction, and rural electrification.

In the 1980s, financial problems caused by massive expenditures in the Iran-Iraq War and damage to oil export facilities by Iran led the Ba'athist government to implement austerity measures, to borrow heavily, and to later reschedule foreign debt payments. Iraq suffered economic losses of at least $80 billion from the war. In 1988, the hostilities ended. Oil exports gradually increased with the construction of new pipelines and restoration of damaged facilities, but again underwent a sharp decline after the Persian Gulf War. GDP dropped to one-fourth of the country's 1980 gross domestic product and continued to decline under postwar international sanctions, until receiving aid from the U.N. Oil-for-Food Programme in 1997.

The Coalition Provisional Authority made efforts to modernize Iraq's economy after the 2003 U.S.-led invasion, through privatization and reducing the country's foreign debt. As a result Iraq's economy expanded rapidly during this time, though growth was stunted by the insurgency, economic mismanagement, and oil shortages caused by outdated technology. Since mid-2009, oil export earnings have returned to levels seen before Operation New Dawn. Government revenues have rebounded, along with global oil prices. Iraq's recent contracts with major oil companies have the potential to greatly expand oil revenues, but Iraq will need to upgrade its oil processing, pipeline, and export infrastructure to enable these deals to reach their potential.

An improved security environment and an initial wave of foreign investment are helping to spur economic activity, particularly in the energy, construction, and retail sectors. Broader economic improvement, long-term fiscal health, and sustained increases in the standard of living still depend on the government passing major policy reforms and on the continued development of Iraq's massive oil reserves. Although foreign investors viewed Iraq with increasing interest in 2010, most are still hampered by difficulties acquiring land for projects and other regulatory impediments.

Recent history

Nominal GDP grew by 213% in the 1960s, 1325% in the 1970s, 2% in the 1980s, −47% in the 1990s, and 317% in 2000s.

Real GDP per capita (measured in $1990 ) increased significantly during the 1950s, 60s and 70s, which can be explained by both higher oil production levels as well as oil prices, which famously peaked in the 1970s due to the OPEC's oil embargo, causing the 1973 oil crisis. In the following two decades, however, GDP per capita in Iraq dropped substantially because of multiple wars, namely the 1980-88 war with Iran, the 1990-1991 Gulf War.

Iran-Iraq War
Before the outbreak of the war with Iran in September 1980, Iraq's economic prospects were bright. Oil production had reached a level of 560,000 m³ (3.5 million barrels) per day in 1979, and oil revenues were 21 billion dollars in 1979 and $27 billion in 1980 due to record oil prices. At the outbreak of the war, Iraq had amassed an estimated $35 billion in foreign exchange reserves. It had the best education and health care systems in the Middle East, and thousands of migrant workers from Egypt, Somalia, and the Indian subcontinent came to the country to work in construction projects.

The Iran–Iraq War and the 1980s oil glut depleted Iraq's foreign exchange reserves, devastated its economy and left the country saddled with a foreign debt of more than $40 billion. After the initial destruction of the war, oil exports gradually increased with the construction of new pipelines and the restoration of damaged facilities.

Sanctions
Iraq's seizure of Kuwait in August 1990, subsequent international economic sanctions on Iraq, and damage from military action by an international coalition beginning in January 1991, drastically reduced economic activity. The regime exacerbated shortages by supporting large military and internal security forces and by allocating resources to key supporters of the Ba'ath Party. The implementation of the UN's Oil for Food program in December 1996 helped improve economic conditions. For the first six six-month phases of the program, Iraq was allowed to export increasing amounts of oil in exchange for food, medicine, and other humanitarian goods. In December 1999, the UN Security Council authorized Iraq to export as much oil as required to meet humanitarian needs. Per capita, food imports increased substantially, while medical supplies and health care services steadily improved, though per capita economic production and living standards were still well below their prewar level.

Iraq changed its oil reserve currency from the U.S. dollar to the euro in 2000. However, 28% of Iraq's export revenues under the program were deducted to meet UN Compensation Fund and UN administrative expenses. The drop in GDP in 2001 was largely the result of the global economic slowdown and lower oil prices.

After invasion of Iraq 2003

The removal of sanctions on 24 May 2003 and rising oil prices in the mid-to-late 2000s led to a doubling in oil production from a low of 1.3 mbpd during the turbulence of 2003 to a high of 2.6 mbpd in 2011. Furthermore, reduced inflation and violence since 2007 have translated to real increases in living standards for Iraqis.

One of the key economic challenges was Iraq's immense foreign debt, estimated at $130 billion.  Although some of this debt was derived from normal export contracts that Iraq had failed to pay for, some was a result of military and financial support during Iraq's war with Iran.

The Jubilee Iraq campaign argued that much of these debts were odious (illegitimate). However, as the concept of odious debt is not accepted, trying to deal with the debt on those terms would have embroiled Iraq in legal disputes for years. Iraq decided to deal with its debt more pragmatically and approached the Paris Club of official creditors.

In a December 2006 Newsweek International article, a study by Global Insight in London was reported to show "that Civil war or not, Iraq has an economy, and—mother of all surprises—it's doing remarkably well. Real estate is booming. Construction, retail and wholesale trade sectors are healthy, too, according to [the report]. The U.S. Chamber of Commerce reports 34,000 registered companies in Iraq, up from 8,000 three years ago. Sales of secondhand cars, televisions and mobile phones have all risen sharply. Estimates vary, but one from Global Insight puts GDP growth at 17 per cent last year and projects 13 per cent for 2006. The World Bank has it lower: at 4 per cent this year. But, given all the attention paid to deteriorating security, the startling fact is that Iraq is growing at all."

Industry

Traditionally, most of Iraq's manufacturing activity has been closely connected to the oil industry. The major industries in that category have been petroleum refining and the manufacture of chemicals and fertilizers. Before 2003, diversification was hindered by limitations on privatization and the effects of the international sanctions of the 1990s. Since 2003, security problems have blocked efforts to establish new enterprises. The construction industry is an exception; in 2000 cement was the only major industrial product not based on hydrocarbons. The construction industry has profited from the need to rebuild after Iraq's several wars. In the 1990s, the industry benefited from government funding of extensive infrastructure and housing projects and elaborate palace complexes.

Primary sectors

Agriculture
Agriculture contributes just 3.3% to the gross national product but employs a fifth of the labor force.

Historically, 50 to 60 per cent of Iraq's arable land has been under cultivation. Because of ethnic politics, valuable farmland in Kurdish territory has not contributed to the national economy, and inconsistent agricultural policies under Saddam Hussein discouraged domestic market production. Despite adequate land and water resources, Iraq remains a net food importer. Under the UN Oil for Food program, Iraq imported large quantities of grains, meat, poultry, and dairy products. The government abolished its farm collectivization program in 1981, allowing a greater role for private enterprise in agriculture.

Iraqi agriculture suffered substantial physical disruption from the Gulf War, and economic disruption from sanctions imposed by the United Nations (August 1990).  Sanctions curtailed imports by cutting off Iraq's petroleum exports and embargoing those agricultural production inputs deemed to have potential military applications.  The Iraqi government responded by monopolizing grain and oilseed marketing, imposing production quotas, and instituting a Public Distribution System for basic foodstuffs.  By mid-1991 the government supplied a "basket" of foodstuffs that provided about one-third of the caloric daily requirement, and cost consumers about five per cent of its market value.  With subsidies for agricultural inputs diminished, the government's prices failed to cover their costs.  The implicit tax on agricultural production was estimated to reach 20 to 35 per cent by the mid-1990s.  In October 1991 the Baghdad regime had withdrawn personnel from the northern region controlled by two Kurdish parties. Kurdistan Region was described as "... a market economy essentially left alone by a very weak governing structure, but heavily influenced by substantial international humanitarian aid flows."

Under an "Oil for Food Program" negotiated with the United Nations, in December 1996 Iraq started exporting petroleum and used the proceeds to start importing foodstuffs three months later.  Grain imports averaged $828 million from 1997 to 2001, an increase of over 180 per cent from the previous five-year period. Due to foreign competition, Iraqi production declined (29 per cent for wheat, 31 per cent for barley, and 52 per cent for maize). Because the government had generally neglected the production of forage crops, fruits, vegetables, and livestock other than poultry, those sectors had remained more traditional and market-based and less buffeted by international affairs. Nevertheless, severe drought, an outbreak of screwworm, and an epizootic of foot-and-mouth disease devastated production during this period.  As the Oil for Food Program expanded to cover more agricultural inputs and machinery, the productivity of Iraqi agriculture stabilized around 2002.

Following the invasion led by the United States in March 2003, with the incomes of many Iraqis devastated, the market for foodstuffs shrunk. Seeking to re-orient Iraq's economy toward private ownership and international competitiveness, the United States saw the dismantling of the Public Distribution System as essential for a market-driven agriculture.  Because of the great reliance of most Iraqis on government-subsidized food, this goal was never realized. Increased productivity became the focus of much of the US-funded agricultural reconstruction program.  Many of these projects were undertaken by the Agricultural Reconstruction and Development Iraq (ARDI) program run by Development Alternatives, Inc. (DAI) of Bethesda, Maryland, under a contract with USAID signed on 15 October 2003.  While ARDI participated in limited ways, the restoration of Iraq's irrigation systems was mostly funded under USAID's contract with Bechtel International.

ARDI conducted demonstration trials of improved practices and varieties of many crops: winter cereals (wheat and barley), summer cereals (rice, maize, and sorghum), potatoes, and tomatoes. Feed supplements and veterinary treatments were demonstrated to increase ovulation, conception, and birth weights of livestock.  Surveys were conducted of poultry growers and apple farmers. Nurseries were established for date palms and grapes.  College buildings and farm tractors were rebuilt. ARDI had projects promoting trade associations and producers' co-ops and supported extension as an appropriate governmental function.  The contract eventually cost over $100 million and lasted through December 2006.  Under its Community Action Program, USAID also funded an analysis of markets for sheep and wool.  It awarded a contract to the University of Hawaii to revitalize higher education in agriculture.  It awarded a contract for $120 million to the Louis Berger Group to promote Iraq's private sector, including agriculture.

Starting in 2006, agricultural reconstruction was also conducted by Provincial Reconstruction Teams within the occupying Multi-National Force – Iraq.  Intended to promote goodwill and sap the insurgency, "PRTs" allowed military commanders to identify local needs and, with few bureaucratic hurdles, to dispense up to $500,000. Civilians from many agencies within the U.S. Department of Agriculture, as well as USAID, served tours on PRTs.  Some participants criticized the absence of a national agricultural strategy, or clear direction on the design of projects.  Others complained that projects emphasized "American-style, 21st-century agricultural technologies and methodologies..." that were inappropriate for Iraq.

Agricultural production has not rebounded noticeably from the reconstruction program.  According to the Food and Agriculture Organization (FAO), between 2002 and 2013, production of wheat increased 11 per cent and milled rice 8 per cent, but barley had decreased 13 per cent and maize 40 per cent.  Scaled in "international dollars" (2004-2006 base equaling 100) Iraq's per capita food production was 135 in 2002, 96 in 2007, and 94 in 2012.  The agricultural sector shed workers.  In those same years, production per worker was 117, 106, and 130, respectively.

The international Oil-for-Food program (1997–2003) further reduced farm production by supplying artificially priced foreign foodstuffs. The military action of 2003 did little damage to Iraqi agriculture; because of favourable weather conditions, in that year grain production was 22 per cent higher than in 2002. Although growth continued in 2004, experts predicted that Iraq will be an importer of agricultural products for the foreseeable future. Long-term plans call for investment in agricultural machinery and materials and more prolific crop varieties—improvements that did not reach Iraq's farmers under the Hussein regime. In 2004, the main crops were wheat, barley, corn, rice, vegetables, dates, and cotton, and the main livestock outputs were cattle and sheep.

The Agricultural Cooperative Bank, capitalized at nearly 1 G$ - by 1984, targets its low-interest, low-collateral loans to private farmers for mechanization, poultry projects, and orchard development. Large modern cattle, dairy, and poultry farms are under construction. Obstacles to agricultural development include labour shortages, inadequate management and maintenance, salinization, urban migration, and dislocations resulting from previous land reform and collectivization programs.

In 2011, an agricultural adviser to the Iraqi government, Layth Mahdi, summarized the forced United States agricultural reconstruction: Before 2003, Iraq had imported about 30 per cent of its food needs annually. The decline in agricultural production after this period, created the need for importing 90 per cent of the food at a cost estimated at more than $12 billion annually. Due to the sudden shift in the agricultural policy from subsidized assistance to an immediate shift to a free market policy, the outcomes led to a decline in production. The observed outcome resulted in many farmers abandoning the land and agriculture. The impact on natural resources results in an exploited and degraded environment leaving the land destitute and the people impoverished, unemployed [and] experiencing a sense of losing their human dignity.Importation of foreign workers and increased entry of women into traditionally male labour roles have helped compensate for agricultural and industrial labour shortages exacerbated by the war. A disastrous attempt to drain the southern marshes and introduce irrigated farming to this region merely destroyed a natural food producing area, while concentration of salts and minerals in the soil due to the draining left the land unsuitable for agriculture.

In the Mada'in Qada region east of Baghdad, hundreds of small farmers united to form the Green Mada'in Association for Agricultural Development, an agricultural cooperative that provides its members with drip irrigation and greenhouses as well as access to credit.

As a result of climate change farmers have been confronted with reduced rainfall and high temperatures. Particularly affected are small scale farmers who, unable to withstand lower water levels, are forced to leave their lands in search of different ways to fulfill their livelihoods.

Forestry, fishing, and mining
Throughout the twentieth century, human exploration, shifting agriculture, forest fires, and uncontrolled grazing denuded large areas of Iraq's natural forests, which in 2005 were almost exclusively confined to the northeastern highlands. Most of the trees found in that region are not suitable for lumbering. In 2002, a total of 112,000 cubic meters of wood were harvested, nearly half of which was used as fuel.

Despite its notable large rivers, Iraq's fishing industry has remained relatively small and based largely on marine species in the Persian Gulf. In 2001, the catch was 22,800 tons.

Aside from hydrocarbons, Iraq's mining industry has been confined to extraction of relatively small amounts of phosphates (at Akashat), salt, and sulfur (near Mosul). Since a productive period in the 1970s, the mining industry has been hampered by the Iran–Iraq War (1980–88), the sanctions of the 1990s, and the economic collapse of 2003.

Energy

Iraq is one of the most oil-rich countries in the world. The country holding the fifth largest proven crude oil reserves, totalling 147.22 billion barrels at the end of 2017. Most of this oil—4 million barrels per day out of 4.3 million barrels produced daily—is exported, making Iraq the third-largest exporter of oil. Despite its ongoing civil war, Iraq was able to increase oil production during 2015 and 2016, with production dipping by 3.5 per cent in 2017 due to conflict with the Kurdistan Regional Government and OPEC production limits. By world standards, production costs for Iraqi oil are relatively low. However, four wars—the 1980–1988 Iraq-Iran War, 1991 Gulf War, the 2003-2011 War in Iraq, and the civil war—and the 1991–2003 UN sanctions have left the industry's infrastructure in poor condition, and the de facto independence of oil-rich Kurdistan Region have limited production.

In the 1970s, Iraq produced over 3.5 million barrels of oil per day. Production began to fall during the Iran-Iraq War, before plummeting 85 per cent after the 1991 invasion of Kuwait. UN sanctions prevented the export of oil until 1996, and then allowed exports only in exchange for humanitarian aid in the Oil-for-Food Programme.

The 2003 lifting of sanctions enabled production—and exports—to restart. Production has since recovered to pre-Gulf War levels, and most of Iraq's oil infrastructure has been repaired, despite persistent sabotage by the Islamic State (ISIL) and others. In 2004, Iraq had eight oil refineries, the largest of which were at Baiji, Basra, and Daura.

Despite its oil wealth, sabotage and technical problems at refineries have forced Iraq to import petroleum, other refined oil products, and electricity from neighbouring countries, especially Iran. In 2004, for example, Iraq spent $60 million per month for imported gasoline. Sabotage
In late 2004 and early 2005, regular sabotage of plants and pipelines reduced export and domestic distribution of oil, particularly to Baghdad. Nationwide fuel shortages and power outages resulted. Persistent ISIL sabotage of pipelines, power plants and power lines, and theft of oil and electricity have also contributed to the July 2018 protests in southern Iraq.

In 2004, plans called for increased domestic utilization of natural gas to replace oil and for use in the petrochemical industry. However, because most of Iraq's gas output is associated with oil, output growth depends on developments in the oil industry.

Half of Iraq's power plants were destroyed in the Persian Gulf War of 1991, and full recovery never occurred. In mid-2004, Iraq had an estimated 5,000 megawatts of power-generating capacity, compared with 7,500 megawatts of demand. At that time, the transmission system included 17,700 kilometres of line. In 2004, plans called for construction of two new power plants and restoration of existing plants and transmission lines to ease the blackouts and economic hardship caused by this shortfall, but sabotage and looting kept capacity below 6,000 megawatts. The ongoing civil war, sabotage of transmission lines, and government corruption caused the electricity shortage to worsen: by 2010 demand outstripped supply by 6000 megawatts.

Oil continues to dominate Iraq's economy. , oil is responsible for over 65 per cent of GDP, 90 per cent of government revenue. Petroleum constitutes 94% of Iraq's exports with a value of $59.73 billion in 2017. The central government hopes to diversify the economy away from oil, and has had some success: non-oil GDP growth, which was below the regional average from 2014 to 2016, pushed above the average in 2017. Despite this, the per cent of government spending going to non-oil investment has continued to decline since 2013 and now stands at only 34 per cent.

2009 oil services contracts

Between June 2009 and February 2010 the Iraqi Oil Ministry tendered for the award of Service Contracts to develop Iraq's existing oil fields. The results of the tender, which were broadcast live on Iraqi television, are as follows for all major fields awarded but excluding the Kurdistan Region where Production Sharing Contracts have been awarded that are currently being disputed by the Baghdad government.  All contracts are awaiting final ratification of the awards by the Iraqi government. Company shares are subject to change as a result of commercial negotiations between parties.

Notes:
 1. Field shares are as a % of the total.  The Iraq state retains a 25% share in all fields for which Service Contracts have been awarded.
 2. Production Increase Share is the millions bbls per day that will attract the Service Fee for the company.
 3. Gross revenue at plateau is the total payment each company will receive upon reaching their declared target plateau production rate (in between 5 and 8 years depending on field), before deduction of any operating costs but in addition to recovery of all development costs as billions of US$ per annum.  The total gross revenue for all companies, after recovery of capital costs, is at plateau production of an additional 9.4 mb/d, 4.34 bn US per annum at a $70 bbl oil price.  The 2010 Iraq govt budget is $60 billion.  $300 billion is approximately $10,000 per annum for each Iraqi citizen.

In summary the shares by region in the increased production are:

Services

Finance
Iraq's financial services have been the subject of post-Hussein reforms. The 17 private banks established during the 1990s were limited to domestic transactions and attracted few private depositors. Those banks and two main state banks were badly damaged by the international embargo of the 1990s. To further privatize and expand the system, in 2003 the Coalition Provisional Authority removed restrictions on international bank transactions and freed the Central Bank of Iraq (CBI) from government control. In its first year of independent operation, the CBI received credit for limiting Iraq's inflation. In 2004, three foreign banks received licenses to do business in Iraq.

Private security
Because of the danger posed by Iraq's ongoing insurgency, the security industry has been a uniquely prosperous part of the services sector. Often run by former US military personnel, in 2005 at least 26 companies offered personal and institutional protection, surveillance, and other forms of security.

Retail
In the early post-Hussein period, a freewheeling retail trade in all types of commodities straddled the line between legitimate and illegitimate commerce, taking advantage of the lack of income tax and import controls.

Tourism
The Iraq tourism industry, which in peaceful times has profited from Iraq's many places of cultural interest (earning US$14 million in 2001), has been dormant since 2003. Despite conditions, in 2005 the Iraqi Tourism Board maintained a staff of 2,500 and 14 regional offices. Between 2009 and 2010, 165 tourists from 16 countries entered Iraq to visit historic sites; as of January 2011, a U.S. State Department grant provided $2 million to help preserve Babylon, supporting the re-opening of one of the site's two museums.

Telecommunications
From 2003 to 2008, mobile phone subscriptions had expanded over hundred-fold to ten million nationwide, according to the Brookings Institution.

Labor force
In 2002, Iraq's labour force was estimated at 6.8 million people.

In 1996, some 66.4 per cent of the labour force worked in services, 17.5 per cent in industry, and 16.1 per cent in agriculture. 2004 estimates of Iraq's unemployment ranged from 30 per cent to 60 per cent.

The CPA has referred to a 25% unemployment rate, the Iraqi Ministry of Planning mentioned a 30% unemployment rate, whereas the Iraqi Ministry of Social Affairs claims it to be 48%. Other sources are claiming a 20% unemployment rate and a probably 60% under-employment rate. The actual figure is problematic because of high participation in black-market activities and poor security conditions in many populous areas. In central Iraq, security concerns discouraged the hiring of new workers and the resumption of regular work schedules. At the same time, the return of Iraqis from other countries increased the number of job seekers. In late 2004, most legitimate jobs were in the government, the army, the oil industry, and security-related enterprises. Under Saddam Hussein Hussein, many of the highest-paid workers were employed by the greatly overstaffed government, whose overthrow disrupted the input of these people to the economy. In 2004, the U.S. Agency for International Development committed US$1 billion for a worker-training program. In early 2004, the minimum wage was US$72 per month.

External trade

Iraq is a founding member of OPEC. Petroleum constitutes 99,7% of Iraq's exports with a value of $43,8 billion in 2016.

From the 1990s until 2003, the international trade embargo restricted Iraq's export activity almost exclusively to oil. In 2003, oil accounted for about US$7.4 billion of Iraq's total US$7.6 billion of export value, and statistics for earlier years showed similar proportions. After the end of the trade embargo in 2003 expanded the range of exports, oil continued to occupy the dominant position: in 2004 Iraq's export income doubled (to US$16.5 billion), but oil accounted for all but US$340 million (2 per cent) of the total. In late 2004, sabotage significantly reduced oil output, and experts forecast that output, hence exports, would be below capacity in 2005 as well. In 2004, the chief export markets were the United States (which accounted for nearly half), Italy, France, Jordan, Canada, and the Netherlands. In 2004, the value of Iraq's imports was US$21.7 billion, incurring a trade deficit of about US$5.2 billion. In 2003, the main sources of Iraq's imports were Turkey, Jordan, Vietnam, the United States, Germany, and Britain. Because of Iraq's inactive manufacturing sector, the range of imports was quite large, including food, fuels, medicines, and manufactured goods. By 2010, exports rose to US$50.8 billion and imports rose to US$45.2 billion.  Chief 2009 export partners were: U.S., India, Italy, South Korea, Taiwan, China, Netherlands, and Japan. Chief 2009 import partners were: Turkey, Syria, U.S., China, Jordan, Italy, and Germany.

References

External links
 
 Iraq Inter-Agency Information & Analysis Unit Reports, Maps and Assessments of Iraq from the UN Inter-Agency Information & Analysis Unit
 Map of Iraq's oil and gas infrastructure

 
Economy of the Arab League
OPEC
Economy of the Middle East